Greg Bajek (born May 29, 1968) is a retired American soccer player, coach and team owner who played professionally in the American Professional Soccer League and owned a franchise in the USL Premier Development League.

Bajek grew up in Clifton, New Jersey and graduated from Clifton High School. He attended Kean College, playing on the men’s soccer team from 1988 to 1990.  He was a 1988 NCAA Division III First Team All American.

In July 1991, Bajek turned professional when he signed with the Penn-Jersey Spirit of the American Professional Soccer League.  In 1992, he moved to Poland where he played for Stal Stalowa Wola. On March 3, 1994, Bajek signed with the North Jersey Imperials of the USISL.  In 1995 and 1996, the Imperials played in the USISL Pro League.  In 1996, Bajek joined the Central Jersey Riptide of the USISL Pro League.  In 1998 and 1999, the team moved down to the USISL D-3 Pro League.  In 2000, he played for the New Brunswick Brigade.  In 2001, Bajek became the owner and coach of the Jersey Falcons.  From 2002 to 2004, he played for the Falcons.  In 2003, he again became the head coach.  When the team collapsed in 2005, Bajek finished his career with the Western Mass Pioneers.

References

Living people
1968 births
American soccer coaches
American soccer players
American expatriate soccer players
American soccer chairmen and investors
American Professional Soccer League players
Stal Stalowa Wola players
Jersey Falcons players
North Jersey Imperials players
Central Jersey Riptide players
New Brunswick Brigade players
Penn-Jersey Spirit players
USISL players
USL Second Division players
USL League Two players
Western Mass Pioneers players
Association football midfielders
Clifton High School (New Jersey) alumni
Soccer players from New Jersey
Sportspeople from Clifton, New Jersey